DaKAR II is the third studio album by South African hip hop recording artist and poet Kwesta. The album was released on 26 February 2016, by Urbantainment, under exclusive license to Sony Music Entertainment Africa. The album was certified diamond and became  South Africa's best selling hip-hop album of all time.

Background and recording 
Kwesta started working on DaKar II in 2014 after a commercial success of the first DakAR which was released at the beginning of 2014.

Commercial Performance 
DaKAR II was certified 7× Platinum  by RISA,  and "Ngyaz'fela Ngawe" has been certified 119× platinum which makes it 11× diamond certified.

DaKAR II won two awards for Best Album of the Year and Male Artist of the Year at the 23rd ceremony  of South African Music Awards.

|-
|rowspan="2"|
| rowspan="2"|DaKAR II
| Best Album of the Year 
| 
|-
| Male Artist of the Year 
|

Singles 
In July 2015 "Nomayini" was released as the album's first official single. It topped most of the country's charts and would go on to be one of the smash jams played in the festive season. At the beginning of 2016 Kwesta released a second single, "Ngud'", which features Cassper Nyovest and DJ Maphorisa as a producer. Ngud' has gone on to be Kwesta's most successful hit single to date, it was on summer 2016 SABC's top 10. Other singles released from the album were "Day One", "Mayibabo" and "Ngiyaz'fela ngawe" as the latest.

Track listing

References

External links 
 iTunes

2016 albums
Albums produced by DJ Maphorisa
Kwesta albums